was a Japanese Neo-Confucian scholar, teacher and administrator in the system of higher education maintained by the Tokugawa bakufu during the Edo period. He was a member of the Hayashi clan of Confucian scholars.

Academician
Hōkō was the fourth Hayashi clan Daigaku-no-kami of the Edo period.

Hōkō is known as the second official rector of the Shōhei-kō.  This academy would come to be known as the Yushima Seidō) . This institution stood at the apex of the country-wide educational and training system which was created and maintained by the Tokugawa shogunate.  Ryūkō's hereditary title was Daigaku-no-kami, which, in the context of the Tokugawa shogunate hierarchy, effectively translates as "head of the state university".

See also
 Hayashi clan (Confucian scholars)

Notes

References

 De Bary, William Theodore, Carol Gluck, Arthur E. Tiedemann. (2005). Sources of Japanese Tradition, Vol. 2. New York: Columbia University Press. ; OCLC  255020415
 Nussbaum, Louis Frédéric and Käthe Roth. (2005). Japan Encyclopedia. Cambridge: Harvard University Press. ; OCLC 48943301

External links
  Tokyo's Shōhei-kō (Yushima Sedō) today
 Waseda:  林榴岡

Advisors to Tokugawa shoguns
Japanese philosophers
Japanese Confucianists
1681 births
1758 deaths
Neo-Confucian scholars